Sherri Steinhauer (born December 27, 1962) is an American professional golfer who plays on the Legends Tour. She retired from the LPGA Tour in 2012 after a 26-year career. She was born in Madison, Wisconsin and attended The University of Texas at Austin. Her rookie season on the LPGA Tour was 1986. She has won eight tournaments on the Tour, including two major championships, the 1992 du Maurier Classic and 2006 Women's British Open (she also has two, 1998 and 1999, titles recognized by the Ladies European Tour as majors but not by the LPGA Tour).

Steinhauer finished as high as seventh on the money list twice. The first time came in 1994 where Steinhauer won the Sprint Championship in addition to having seven other top 10 finishes. Steinhauer also qualified for the Solheim Cup for the first time in 1994. She would also make the team in 1998, 2000, and 2007.

With wins at the Japan Airlines Big Apple Classic and the Weetabix Women's British Open, Steinhauer finished seventh on the money list again in 1999. She also took part that year in a six player sudden playoff at the Jamie Farr Kroger Classic in which Se Ri Pak defeated Steinhauer, Karrie Webb, Carin Koch, Mardi Lunn, and Kelli Kuehne.  It was the largest playoff in LPGA Tour history.

Steinhauer was a student of golf instructor Manuel de la Torre.

On March 31, 2009, Steinhauer announced that she would not compete in 2009 while recovering from surgery in mid-February on one hip and preparing for similar surgery on the other hip to be performed in May. She returned to the Tour in 2010.

Steinhauer announced her retirement from the regular tour after missing the cut at the 2011 Canadian Women's Open. She returned in 2012 at the Kia Classic and also played that year in the Kraft Nabisco Championship. She was eligible to participate in the 2018 U.S. Senior Women's Open on account of her major wins.

Steinhauer was one of two assistant captains for the United States 2011 Solheim Cup team.

Professional wins (10)

LPGA Tour wins (8)

^ Co-sanctioned with Ladies European Tour

LPGA Tour playoff record (1–1)

Legends Tour wins (2)
2009 Legends Tour Open Championship
2013 Wendy's Charity Challenge

Major championships

Wins (2)

Results timeline

^ The Women's British Open replaced the du Maurier Classic as an LPGA major in 2001.

LA = Low amateur
CUT = missed the half-way cut
"T" = tied

Summary
Starts – 96
Wins – 2
2nd-place finishes – 0
3rd-place finishes – 0
Top 3 finishes – 2
Top 5 finishes – 3
Top 10 finishes – 9
Top 25 finishes – 28
Missed cuts – 32
Most consecutive cuts made – 9
Longest streak of top-10s – 2

Team appearances
Professional
Solheim Cup (representing the United States): 1994 (winners), 1998 (winners), 2000, 2007 (winners)
Lexus Cup (representing International team): 2006
Handa Cup (representing the United States): 2010 (winners), 2011 (winners), 2012 (tie, Cup retained), 2014 (winners)

References

External links

American female golfers
Texas Longhorns women's golfers
LPGA Tour golfers
Winners of LPGA major golf championships
Solheim Cup competitors for the United States
Golfers from Wisconsin
Sportspeople from Madison, Wisconsin
1962 births
Living people